Erechthis is a genus of Caribbean katydids in the tribe Agraeciini. They are distributed across a few islands in the Greater Antilles region.

There are three species:

 Erechthis ayiti De Luca and Morris, 2016 ― found in Haiti
 Erechthis gundlachi Bolívar, 1888 ― found in Cuba and the Dominican Republic
 Erechthis levyi De Luca and Morris, 2016 ― found in The Bahamas

References 

Tettigoniidae
Tettigoniidae genera
Greater Antilles